Sorcerer is an interactive fiction computer game written by Steve Meretzky and released by Infocom in 1984. It is the second game in the magic-themed "Enchanter trilogy", preceded by Enchanter and followed by Spellbreaker. It is Infocom's eleventh game.

Plot
Following the unlikely defeat of Krill in Enchanter, the player's character has progressed from an Apprentice Enchanter to earning a coveted seat in the Circle of Enchanters. Belboz the Necromancer, the leader of the Circle, has become not only a mentor but a close friend as well. Lately, Belboz has seemed different, distracted, even talking to himself at length. Whatever he's dealing with, Belboz doesn't see fit to confide in anyone, then suddenly he disappears.

Gameplay
Potions are used by drinking them and each can only be used once. Sorcerer has 70 ways for the player to die.

Release
The Sorcerer package includes the following physical items:
A copy of the fictitious magazine Popular Enchanting featuring a profile of Belboz
An "Infotater", a paper code wheel disguised as information about creatures in the game. The Infotater was found in the original package only. When the game was later re-released in the "gray stripe" box format, the Infotater was replaced by a "Field Guide to the Creatures of Frobozz" brochure containing the same information. Consequently, original Infotaters are highly sought-after by collectors. The Field Guide or Infotater is necessary to open the chest and acquire its contents in the game.

Reception
St.Game stated that "The world of the Sorcerer is rich in detail and wonderment. The magical experiences resemble the exotic adventures of Carlos Castaneda", with "several diabolical traps and puzzles", and concluded that "The final solution is like a delicate orchid achieving full bloom. Long after the game is over, the heady fragrance stays with you". PC Magazine gave Sorcerer 10.5 points out of 12. It noted the dramatic opening and the game's "predisposition against violence", offering the player spells instead of weapons. Zzap!64 noted the high (£45.30) British price of the game and necessity to own a disk drive, but called it "a tremendous challenge and full of surprises ... lengthy location descriptions, great atmosphere, and highly addictive qualities".

References

External links 
 
 Package scans

1980s interactive fiction
1984 video games
Adventure games
Amiga games
Amstrad CPC games
Amstrad PCW games
Apple II games
Atari 8-bit family games
Atari ST games
Classic Mac OS games
Commodore 64 games
CP/M games
DOS games
Fantasy video games
Infocom games
Steve Meretzky games
TI-99/4A games
TRS-80 games
Video games developed in the United States
Zork
Single-player video games